Andrés Thorlacius Thorleifsson (born 19 July 1988) is a Swedish footballer who plays for Riala GoIF as a defender. He used to be a striker, but moved back to the defender position when he ended his professional career 2014.

References

External links

1988 births
Living people
Association football forwards
Sollentuna FK players
Falkenbergs FF players
Swedish footballers
Allsvenskan players